Noé González Alcoba (born 12 May 1979) is an Uruguayan boxer and a former world title challenger.

Professional career
Having boxed mainly in Argentina and Uruguay for much of his early career, he managed to land a shot at the WBA World Middleweight title after only 14 fights, challenging the then world champion Felix Sturm in Germany. The German proved too classy however and won the fight by a wide points decision, earning Alcoba his first career defeat.

Alcoba continued to box in Uruguay and Argentina, acquiring an impressive knockout ration and capturing the vacant WBO Latino middleweight title in his 19th bout. He disposed of former WBA middleweight title holder Mariano Natalio Carrera in four rounds, also boxing in the United States to stop rated Mexican middleweight Michi Munoz in six before stepping up to super middleweight to win the WBC Silver belt by a 3rd-round stoppage of a former Mexican middleweight champion Gustavo Magallanes. After a first successful defense of the belt in a bout against Mexican Ruben Padilla, he lost the second defense, suffering his 2nd professional defeat in a 2-round stoppage loss to world title contender and knockout artist Adonis "Superman" Stevenson in Montreal, Canada.

Following the Stevenson loss he has recovered in style, earning two 1st-round knockout wins. He lost in his latest fight to then unbeaten British prospect George Groves  by 5th round technical knockout on the Froch vs. Kessler bill in May.

Professional boxing record 

|-
|align="center" colspan=8|30 Wins (22 KOs), 4 Losses, 0 Draw
|-
!style="border-style: none none solid solid; background: #e3e3e3"|Res.
!style="border-style: none none solid solid; background: #e3e3e3"|Record
!style="border-style: none none solid solid; background: #e3e3e3"|Opponent
!style="border-style: none none solid solid; background: #e3e3e3"|Type
!style="border-style: none none solid solid; background: #e3e3e3"|Round
!style="border-style: none none solid solid; background: #e3e3e3"|Date
!style="border-style: none none solid solid; background: #e3e3e3"|Location
!style="border-style: none none solid solid; background: #e3e3e3"|Notes
|-
|Loss
|30-4
| Rocky Fielding
|TKO
|5
|2014-07-12
| Echo Arena, Liverpool, Merseyside, United Kingdom
|
|-
|Loss
|30-3
| George Groves
|TKO
|5
|25.05.2013
| London, United Kingdom
|
|-
|Win
|30-2
| Idiozan Matos
|KO
|1
|16.02.2013
| Montevideo, Uruguay
|
|-
|Win
|29-2
| Miguel Angel Cobas
|KO
|1
|20.10.2012
| Buenos Aires, Argentina
|
|-
|Loss
|28-2
| Adonis Stevenson
|TKO
|2
|20.04.2012
| Montreal, Canada
|For the WBC Silver super middleweight title
|-
|Win
|28-1
| Paul Rodriguez
|KO
|2
|15.10.2011
| Los Mochis, Mexico
|
|-
|Win
|27-1
| Ruben Padilla
|TKO
|9
|13.05.2011
| Montevideo, Uruguay
|Defended WBC Silver super middleweight title
|-
|Win
|26-1
| Gustavo Magallanes
|TKO
|3
|09.01.2011
| Punta del Este, Uruguay
|For WBC Silver super middleweight title
|-
|Win
|25-1
| Antonio Arras
|TKO
|9
|29.10.2010
| Mexicali, Mexico
|
|-
|Win
|24-1
| Michi Munoz
|TKO
|6
|04.06.2010
| Florida, United States
|
|-
|Win
|23-1
| Denis De Barros
|KO
|2
|04.12.2009
| Santa Fe, Argentina
|
|-
|Win
|22-1
| Ismael Bueno
|KO
|2
|06.11.2009
| Montevideo, Uruguay
|
|-
|Win
|21-1
| Mariano Natalio Carrera
|KO
|4
|20.08.2009
| Buenos Aires, Argentina
|
|-
|Win
|20-1
| Juraci Conceicao
|KO
|2
|18.06.2009
| Montevideo, Uruguay
|
|-
|Win
|19-1
| Oscar Bruno Fuchs
|KO
|2
|23.02.2009
| Canelones, Uruguay
|
|-
|Win
|18-1
| Valentin Antonio Ochoa
|TKO
|6
|10.01.2009
| Punta del Este, Uruguay
|For WBO Latino middleweight title
|-
|Win
|17-1
| Martin David Islas
|TKO
|5
|25.10.2008
| Salto, Uruguay
|
|-
|Win
|16-1
| Cristian Ricardo Rizzo
|KO
|3
|05.09.2008
| Montevideo, Uruguay
|
|-
|Win
|15-1
| Mario Javier Nieva
|UD
|6
|08.08.2008
| Montevideo, Uruguay
|
|-
|Loss
|14-1
| Felix Sturm
|UD
|12
|30.06.2007
| Stuttgart, Germany
|For the  WBA middleweight title.
|-
|Win
|14-0
| Raul Alberto Gutierrez Sanchez
|RTD
|3
|02.06.2007
| Santa Fe, Argentina
|
|-
|Win
|13-0
| Claudio Ariel Abalos
|UD
|10
|02.12.2006
| Pando, Uruguay
|For  WBA Fedelatin middleweight title.
|-
|Win
|12-0
| Raul Alberto Gutierrez Sanchez
|UD
|4
|13.10.2006
| Santa Fe, Argentina
|
|-
|Win
|11-0
| Cristian Oscar Zanabria
|UD
|6
|14.09.2006
| Montevideo, Uruguay
|
|-
|Win
|10-0
| Jose Emilio Mazurier
|KO
|6
|19.08.2006
| Santa Fe, Argentina
|
|-
|Win
|9-0
| Ricardo Manuel Genero
|TKO
|3
|14.07.2006
| Santa Fe, Argentina
|
|-
|Win
|8-0
| Lucas Damian Molina
|RTD
|5
|15.04.2006
| Buenos Aires, Argentina
|
|-
|Win
|7-0
| Santos Tomas Villalba
|UD
|6
|11.02.2006
| Santa Fe, Argentina
|
|-
|Win
|6-0
| Dante Heraldo Emiliano Hirschfeld
|TKO
|6
|29.10.2005
| Buenos Aires, Argentina
|
|-
|Win
|5-0
| Santos Tomas Villalba
|SD
|6
|19.08.2005
| Santa Fe, Argentina
|
|-
|Win
|4-0
| Santos Tomas Villalba
|UD
|4
|20.05.2005
| Santa Fe, Argentina
|
|-
|Win
|3-0
| Ramon Javier Cabanas
|UD
|4
|26.03.2005
| Buenos Aires, Argentina
|
|-
|Win
|2-0
| Jose Luis Carrizo
|KO
|2
|06.11.2004
| Santa Fe, Argentina
|
|-
|Win
|1-0
| Jose Luis Olivera
|KO
|1
|02.10.2004
| Buenos Aires, Argentina
|

References

External links
 

1979 births
Living people
Uruguayan male boxers
Middleweight boxers
Super-middleweight boxers
Southpaw boxers
People from Pando, Uruguay